is a Japanese voice actress, singer and narrator who works for Kenyuu Office.

Career
She was born in Tokyo and her artistic history is Katsuta Voice actor school, Beniya 25 o'clock, and voicegarage. She joined a unit called Oeser Corps with Yu Urata, Sachi Matsumoto, Kōki Harasawa, Yukiko Takaguchi and Asami Yaguchi who co-starred in the anime Fantastic Children.

Along with Ai Mizuno and Aya Endo, she formed a unit called Plume, which has been working on releasing self-produced CDs, stage and internet radio. On December 8, 2007, the company announced that it had signed with Lantis at a live event.

Filmography

Anime

Aki Sora as Aki Aoi
Law of Ueki as Barou Esharotto
Ikkitousen: Dragon Destiny as Bunwa Kaku
Trigger Heart Exelica as Exelica
Princess Resurrection as Flandre
Grope: Yami no Naka no Kotoritachi as Fubuki Momose
Touka Gettan as Fuu
Manin Densha as Haruka Miwa
Fantastic Children as Helga
Izumo: Takeki Tsurugi no Senki as Himiko
Ane Haramix as Hitomi Takami
Musashi as Kaguya
Tenchi Muyo! GXP as Karen
Kagihime Monogatari Eikyuu Alice Rondo as Kirika Kagarigi
Koihime†Musō as Kousonsan
Hoshiuta: Starlight Serenade as Kurara Amamiya
Hoshiuta as Kurara Amamiya
Black Lagoon as Maki
Tenjho Tenge as Mana Kuzunoha
Rozen Maiden Ouvertüre as Megu Kakizaki
Rozen Maiden Träumend as Megu Kakizaki
Immoral as Minami Kawai
Little Busters! as Mio Nishizono
Little Busters Ex! as Mio Nishizono
Shōjo Sect as Momoko Naitou
Discipline (OVA) as Otokawa Saori
Assassination Classroom as Rinka Hayami
Gift ~eternal rainbow~ as Rinka Hokazono
Ray the Animation as Rumi
Zettai Shougeki ~Platonic Heart~ as Saki Daimonji
Oku-sama wa Joshi Kōsei as Satomi Endou
School Days as Sekai Saionji
Summer Days as Sekai Saionji
Hoshizora e Kakaru Hashi as Senka Yorozu
Majin Tantei Nougami Neuro as Shiho Ezaki
Kakyuusei 2 as Tamaki Saimon
Kakyuusei 2: Anthology as Tamaki Saimon
Iro ni Ide ni Keri Waga Koi wa as Tomone Harukaze
Imōto Jiru as Yukie Kohinata
Innocent Blue as Yumi
Case Closed as Hamaka Oiso
Kaginado as Mio Nishizono
Cafe Junkie as  Minami Kurumi

Video Games
Yume Miru Kusuri: A Drug That Makes You Dream as Aeka Shiraki
Tales of Graces as Cheria Barnes
Crash Fever as Ghatanothoa

Dubbing
Alyson Stoner
Alice Upside Down (Alice McKinley)
Camp Rock (Caitlyn Gellar)
Camp Rock 2: The Final Jam (Caitlyn Gellar)
Phineas and Ferb (Isabella Garcia-Shapiro)
Step Up 3D (Camille Gage)
Step Up: All In (Camille Gage)
Big Nothing (Josie McBroom (Alice Eve))
Desperate Housewives (Kayla Huffington (Rachel G. Fox))
Intermezzo (Ann Marie Brandt (Ann Todd))
Lara Croft: Tomb Raider (Lara Croft (young) (Rachel Appleton))
The Secret of Kells as Aisling

Staff roles
Kakyuusei 2 (TV) : Theme Song Performance (Katyusha : OP + ED)
Kakyuusei 2: Anthology (OAV) : Theme Song Performance (Katyusha 2nd: OP+ED)
Oku-sama wa Joshi Kousei (TV) : Theme Song Performance (ED)
Rozen Maiden Träumend (TV) : Megu Kakizaki's Theme (Insert)

Dubbing roles
The Triplets* Ana

References

External links
Official agency profile 
Shiho Kawaragi at Ryu's Seiyuu Infos

1976 births
Living people
Japanese women singers
Japanese video game actresses
Japanese voice actresses
Voice actresses from Tokyo